Piven ("rooster" in Ukrainian) is a surname. Notable persons with that surname include:

 Byrne Piven (1929–2002), American actor
 Frances Fox Piven (born 1932), American sociologist and political scientist
 Hanoch Piven (born 1963), Israeli artist
 Jeremy Piven (born 1965), American actor
 Joyce Piven (born 1930), American director
 Shahar Piven (born 1995), Israeli footballer
 Shira Piven (born 1961), American director
 Pouria Piven (born 2000),Singer and Music/HipHop/Rap Artist

See also
 

Ukrainian-language surnames